Jorge Martin Orozco Dias (born 9 April 2000) is a Mexican sport shooter. He represented Mexico at the 2020 Summer Olympics in Tokyo.

References

2000 births
Living people
Mexican male sport shooters
Shooters at the 2020 Summer Olympics
Olympic shooters of Mexico
Sportspeople from Guadalajara, Jalisco
21st-century Mexican people